Fahd (“leopard“ or “cheetah”), also transliterated Fahed or Fahad, can refer to:

People

Given name

Fahad 
Fahad Ali (born 1987), Indian television actor
Fahad Babar (born 1992), Pakistani born American cricketer
Fahad Al-Bishi (born 1965), Saudi football player
Fahad Belal Al-Salik (born 1991), Saudi basketball player
Fahad Albutairi (born 1985), Saudi stand-up comedian
Fahad Ensour (born 1934), Jordanian politician
Fahad Fazil, Indian actor
Fahad Mustafa (born 1983), Pakistani actor
Fahad Shah, Kashmiri journalist
Fahad Usman (born 1976), UAE cricketer
Yusuf Salman Yusuf (1901–1949), better known by his nom de guerre Fahad, Iraqi communist leader

Fahd 
Fahd of Saudi Arabia (1921–2005), king of Saudi Arabia, 1982–2005
Fahd bin Abdul Rahman Balghunaim (born 1952), Saudi engineer
Fahd Ballan (1933–1997), popular Syrian Druze singer
Fahd Jaradat (1930–2015), Jordanian soldier and politician
Fahd Jassem al-Freij (born 1950), Syrian politician and minister
Fahd Faraj al-Juwair (1969–2006), high-ranking member of al-Qaeda who was the highest member of that organization in Saudi Arabia
Fahd Hariri (born 1980s), youngest son of slain Lebanese prime minister Rafiq Hariri
Fahd Al-Hayyan (born 1971), Saudi Arabian actor
Fahd Al-Rasheed, Saudi businessman and Managing Director of Emaar Economic City (EEC)
Fahd bin Mahmoud al Said (born 1940), deputy prime minister of the Sultanate of Oman
Fahd bin Abdullah Al Saud (born 1941), Saudi royal and former deputy defense minister 
Fahd bin Salman Al Saud (1955–2001), Saudi royal and businessman
Fahd bin Saud Al Saud (1923–2006), Saudi Arabian royal and businessman
Fahd bin Sultan Al Saud (born 1950), Saudi royal and governor of Tabuk Province

Fahed
Fahed Attal (born 1985), Palestinian football player
Fahed Boodai, Kuwaiti investment banker and businessman

Family name

Fahad 
Ghanima Al-Fahad (born 1973), Kuwaiti media personality

Fahed 
Rony Fahed (born 1981), Lebanese basketball player

Other uses
 Fahd (armored personnel carrier), a 4x4 Egyptian armored personnel carrier
 Al-Fahd, a Saudi armoured vehicle
 Al Fahd 300, a Saudi missile

See also
King Fahd (disambiguation), places and institution carrying King Fahd name
Fahad, Iran (disambiguation), villages in Iran
Fahda (name)

Arabic masculine given names
Pakistani masculine given names